Algeria, participated at the 2007 All-Africa Games held in the city of Algiers, Algeria. It participated with  athletes in 24 sports and won 211 medals at the end of these games.

Medal summary

Medal table

Gold Medal

Silver Medal

Bronze Medal

References

2007
All-Africa Games
Nations at the 2007 All-Africa Games